Bernard Stewart or Stuart may refer to:

 Lord Bernard Stewart (1623–1645), Scottish aristocrat and Royalist commander in the English Civil War
 Bernard Stewart, 4th Lord of Aubigny (c. 1452–1508), French soldier and diplomat
 Bernard Denis Stewart (1900-1988), Australian Catholic bishop
 Bernard Halley Stewart, British physician
 Bernard Stewart, alias used by Ernie O'Malley (1897–1957), Irish Republican Army officer, upon his capture
 Bernard Stuart, 18th century abbot of Scots Monastery, Regensburg